Garrett v A-G [1997] 2 NZLR 332 is a cited case in New Zealand regarding claims in tort for misfeasance in public office
.

Background
Judith Garrett had lodged a complaint with the police that she had been raped by several off duty police officers.

Later, when the police declined to prosecute the officers, Garrett sued the police for malfeasance for refusing to prosecute

Held
Garrett's claim was dismissed.

References

New Zealand tort case law
1997 in New Zealand law
Court of Appeal of New Zealand cases
1997 in case law